Etringus is an extinct genus of prehistoric bony fish that lived during the Upper Miocene subepoch.

References

Miocene fish
Clupeiformes
Miocene fish of North America